Matthew Shlomowitz (born 7 February 1975) is a composer of contemporary classical music and Associate Professor in Composition at the University of Southampton.

Biography

He also studied privately with Michael Finnissy in the United Kingdom.

Since 2002 he has lived in London where he lectured at the Royal College of Music and for the Syracuse University London Program. He taught composition at Durham University during the 2008/09 academic year and was a Programme Collaborator for the Borealis Festival in Norway.

Music
He is co-director of Plus minus ensemble and the performance series Rational Rec and is a member of InterInterInter, a group that creates events mixing performance and audience activity. He was also a co-founder of Ensemble Offspring. 
He has been represented by the New Voices scheme at the British Music Information Centre and by the Australian Music Centre.

The bulk of his compositions are for chamber ensembles and often involve unusual instrumental combinations. Free Square Jazz, for instance, is for recorder, electric guitar, double bass and drum kit and Line and Length is scored for soprano saxophone, oboe, clarinet, bass clarinet & bassoon.

A number of his works are interdisciplinary such as the music-video pieces Train Travel and Six Aspects of the Body in Image and Sound (co-created with Rees Archibald) and an ongoing series of works for visual performer and musician called Letter Pieces. Certain works fall more comfortably into the genre of "performance pieces" such as Northern Cities and When is a Door Not a Door?  Other works blur the boundaries between concert music and performance piece such as Five Monuments of Our Time, an orchestral work that requires the conductor to perform a series of choreographed gestures often ludicrously unrelated to the music being played. Such apparent absurdity and humor is not unintended; it has been said that, 

Some of his music shows the structural constraints analogous to the rules of Oulipo; familiar sounds from popular and everyday culture are also a regular feature of his music palette.

Musical style
He has described his own music as being "something like the bastard love child of Brian Ferneyhough and Philip Glass."

Musical works 
Selected musical works, including commissions and major works, are:

Operas
Electric Dreams (2017)

Prizes and awards
7th Johann-Joseph-Fux Competition for Opera Composition

References

External links
 Matthew Shlomowitz official site
 British Music Information Centre
 Australian Music Centre
 

1975 births
21st-century classical composers
20th-century classical composers
Australian classical composers
Australian male classical composers
Constrained writing
Living people
Sydney Conservatorium of Music alumni
20th-century Australian male musicians
20th-century Australian musicians
21st-century Australian male musicians
21st-century Australian musicians